David Bortolussi (born 21 June 1981) is a French-born Italian rugby union footballer. He usually plays at full back or on the wing.

Club career
He played for French club Montpellier Hérault RC in the top league, the Top 14, from 2003/04 to 2007/08. He previously played for other French clubs Bègles-Bordeaux in 2002-03, FC Auch in 2001-02 and JS Riscle in 2010/11, becoming player-coach in 2015/16.

International career
Bortolussi had 16 caps for the national rugby team of Italy, having made his debut in a Test against Japan, in 52-6 win, in Tokyo from 2006 to 2008, scoring 1 try, 35 conversions, 25 penalties and 1 drop goal, 153 points on aggregate. He played for Italy during the 2006 Autumn internationals. He was called for the 2007 Rugby World Cup, playing in all four games, scoring 4 conversions and 8 penalties, 32 points on aggregate. It would be his only presence at the competition. He played at the 2008 Six Nations Championship, in two games, scoring 1 conversion and 6 penalties, 20 points on aggregate. He had his last cap for the national team at 10 February 2008, at the 19-23 loss to England, in Rome, in a game where he scored 1 conversion and 4 penalties. He was only 26 years old.

References

External links
RBS 6 Nations profile
David Bortolussi on ercrugby.com
Scrum profile
itsrugby profile

1981 births
Living people
French rugby union players
Italian rugby union players
US Dax players
French people of Italian descent
Rugby union fullbacks
Rugby union wings
Italy international rugby union players
Montpellier Hérault Rugby players
CA Bordeaux-Bègles Gironde players
People from Auch
Sportspeople from Gers